Glenn Ochal (born March 1, 1986) is an American rower. He won the bronze medal in the coxless four at the 2012 Summer Olympics. He competed in the coxed eights at the 2016 Summer Olympics and finished fourth.

A native of the Philadelphia neighborhood of Roxborough, Ochal began rowing as a freshman at Roman Catholic High School. He was recruited for Princeton University's rowing team and was part of the crew which became the first collegiate team to win the Championship Eights at the Head of the Charles Regatta in twenty years. He currently works at Sparks Consulting, a social business that is concerned with rowing community development.

See also
 List of Princeton University Olympians

References

External links
 
 

1986 births
Living people
Rowers from Philadelphia
Rowers at the 2012 Summer Olympics
Rowers at the 2016 Summer Olympics
Olympic bronze medalists for the United States in rowing
Medalists at the 2012 Summer Olympics
Princeton Tigers rowers
American male rowers